Maples is an unincorporated community in northeastern Texas County, Missouri, United States. It is located approximately seven miles northeast of Licking on Missouri Route C.

History
A post office called Maples was established in 1891, and remained in operation until 1967. J. J. Maples, an early postmaster, gave the community his last name.

References

Unincorporated communities in Texas County, Missouri
Unincorporated communities in Missouri